Hans Eli Sebastian Fors (born 16 December 1990), known by the pseudonym Forsen, is a Swedish Twitch streamer who initially gained popularity for having competed in StarCraft II, but is best known for competing in Hearthstone and for streaming a variety of popular games. He is also known for his rowdy fanbase, who call themselves "Forsen Boys" or "Forsen Bajs" and have had a hand in popularizing a number of internet memes. Since December 2018, Forsen has had over one million followers on Twitch, and as of October 2022, has more than 1.6 million followers.

Esports career

StarCraft II 
In 2011, Forsen won first place in the E-Sport SM May Qualifier and was the runner-up in the E-Sport SM October Qualifier, earning a total of 3,500 Swedish krona ($382.50) and qualifying for the Swedish National Championships in StarCraft II. In 2012, Forsen garnered attention by advancing to the final group stage of the 2012 DreamHack Stockholm StarCraft II tournament.

Hearthstone 
In Hearthstone, Forsen won his first tournament in the May 2015 HTC Invitational, and won a Play it Cool streaming marathon in October 2015, achieving the highest rank among the competitors after 24 hours of play. In 2015, Forsen was one of the top four Hearthstone streamers, streaming to up to 45,000 viewers on his live stream on Twitch. He was once known as one of the game's most skilled experts at the Miracle Rogue deck, having piloted it to achieve the highest rank in the game's ladder system on both the North American and European servers in June 2014. In 2017, after spending much of his Hearthstone career as a free agent, Forsen signed with American esports organization Cloud9 as a streamer.

Streaming career 
As of January 2023, Forsen had been a livestreamer on Twitch for over a decade. His stream has been lauded as "genuinely... fun and entertaining" for its tightly knit community and inside jokes, as well as for Forsen's tendency to stream "Lidl" games, a term coined by Forsen to describe games of low production value.

In February 2018, Forsen captained his four-player team to first place in a $100,000 Twitch Rivals PlayerUnknown's Battlegrounds (PUBG) Invitational tournament, winning $13,600. The following month, he also participated in the Darwin Project Invitational tournament, taking first place and winning US$20,000. In December 2018, he achieved a personal all-time high viewer count of 80,860.

In late 2020, Forsen began a friendly rivalry with fellow streamer xQc, the pair competing to achieve the fastest time in a speedrun of Minecraft. As of January 2023, xQc has a personal best of 20:05, 33 seconds faster than Forsen's best time.

On 26 November 2020, Forsen received an indefinite suspension from Twitch after he accidentally showed a GIF sent to him by a viewer displaying a sexually explicit interaction between a woman and a horse on stream. He was unbanned after a month.

Community 
Forsen's stream community, known as the "Forsen Boys" or "Forsen Bajs", has gained notoriety of its own through its practice of stream sniping, especially in games like PUBG. Stream snipers in Forsen's community are noted for locating Forsen in-game and playing loud music and audio through voice chat, and represent a point of appeal for Forsen's audience. In 2018, the Darwin Project Invitational tournament was disrupted by the infiltration of a match lobby by Samme1g, a stream sniper in Forsen's community.

The community is also known for its practice of spamming, and its resulting popularization of internet memes and Twitch emotes. The spread of notable emotes such as "MonkaS" and "PepeHands" (images of Pepe the Frog) have been attributed to Forsen's community on Reddit. Their references to Ugandan action-comedy film Who Killed Captain Alex? have also helped popularise the Ugandan Knuckles meme. In January 2018, a warped image of Fors' face ("forsenE") became the most-used emote on Twitch worldwide.

Forsen's moderation of the community has been described as "permissive" and "laissez-faire", and in 2015, he distanced himself from their actions and the "Forsen Boys" label. That year, streamer Katy Coe became the target of sexual harassment from members of Forsen's community, culminating in Forsen banning links to her channel after Coe posted to Reddit denouncing the behavior. In 2017, Forsen received a 24-hour ban from Twitch after members of his community spammed the n-word in the 2017 Awesome Games Done Quick chat room.

Awards and nominations

References

External links

Living people
Hearthstone players
Swedish esports players
StarCraft players
1990 births
Twitch (service) streamers
Cloud9 (esports) players
Swedish expatriates in Spain
People from Umeå